Anerastia celsella is a moth of the family Pyralidae first described by Francis Walker in 1863. It is found in Sri Lanka.

References

Moths of Asia
Moths described in 1863
Phycitini